Alexander Islamov (born October 11, 1986) is a former Russian professional ice hockey centre.

Islamov played in the Russian Superleague and the Kontinental Hockey League for HC Neftekhimik Nizhnekamsk and Metallurg Novokuznetsk between 2007 and 2013. He signed for the Edinburgh Capitals in the United Kingdom's Elite Ice Hockey League on July 31, 2017. He was however released from the team just four months later after playing eleven games.

References

External links

1986 births
Living people
Ariada Volzhsk players
Edinburgh Capitals players
Kazzinc-Torpedo players
Metallurg Novokuznetsk players
HC Neftekhimik Nizhnekamsk players
People from Orsk
Russian ice hockey centres
Yermak Angarsk players
Yuzhny Ural Orsk players
Sportspeople from Orenburg Oblast
Russian expatriate ice hockey people
Russian expatriate sportspeople in Kazakhstan
Expatriate ice hockey players in Kazakhstan
Expatriate ice hockey players in Scotland
Russian expatriate sportspeople in Scotland